Francisco Andrade Amiel (born 20 January 1996) is a Portuguese professional basketball player who plays for Lusitânia Expert.

He played in the United States between 2015 and 2019 for Colgate Raiders.

References

1996 births
Living people
Portuguese men's basketball players
Sporting CP basketball players
Point guards
Sportspeople from Lisbon